Franco Matías González (born 20 January 1998) is an Argentine professional footballer who plays as a midfielder for Colegiales.

Career
González's career began with Colegiales. Juan Carlos Kopriva moved the midfielder into the club's senior squad in February 2019, as he made his professional debut on 10 February versus Estudiantes in Primera B Metropolitana; replacing Franco Gómez with twenty-three minutes remaining of a goalless draw.

Career statistics
.

References

External links

1998 births
Living people
Place of birth missing (living people)
Argentine footballers
Association football midfielders
Primera B Metropolitana players
Club Atlético Colegiales (Argentina) players